Alexander Gritsch (born 12 August 1981) is an Austrian Para-cyclist who represented Austria at the 2020 Summer Paralympics.

Career
Gritsch represented Austria at the 2021 UCI Para-cycling Road World Championships in the time trial H4 event and won a bronze medal.

Gritsch represented Austria in the men's road time trial H4 event at the 2020 Summer Paralympics and won a bronze medal.

References

Living people
1982 births
Austrian male cyclists
Cyclists at the 2020 Summer Paralympics
Medalists at the 2020 Summer Paralympics
Paralympic medalists in cycling
Paralympic bronze medalists for Austria
People from Imst District
Sportspeople from Tyrol (state)
21st-century Austrian people